Shag River may refer to one of two rivers in southern New Zealand:

 Shag River (Otago)
 Shag River (Fiordland), on Resolution Island